Stacy-Ann Camille-Ann King (born 17 July 1983) is a Trinidadian former cricketer who played as an all-rounder, batting left-handed and bowling left-arm medium. Between 2009 and 2019, she appeared in 75 One Day Internationals and 86 Twenty20 Internationals for the West Indies. She played domestic cricket for Trinidad and Tobago and Adelaide Strikers.

In 2010, along with Tremayne Smartt, she set the record for the highest third wicket partnership in a Twenty20 International, with 124 runs: they held the record for 9 years, and it is now the third-highest partnership for the third wicket. In July 2019, Cricket West Indies awarded her with a central contract for the first time, ahead of the 2019–20 season.

She graduated from the University of Trinidad and Tobago in 2020 with a bachelor's degree in sports studies.

References

External links

1983 births
Living people
West Indian women cricketers
West Indies women One Day International cricketers
West Indies women Twenty20 International cricketers
Trinidad and Tobago women cricketers
Adelaide Strikers (WBBL) cricketers
University of Trinidad and Tobago alumni